Roggenbeuren is a village in the municipality of Deggenhausertal in the Bodenseekreis district of Baden-Württemberg, Germany.

Geography
Roggenbeuren is located in a valley halfway between Urnau and Wittenhofen.

History
Burial mounds in the vicinity prove that the area has been settled since prehistoric times. The first mention of Roggenbeuren dates from a donation from St Gall's Abbey in 860/1 in which the brothers Otholf and Teothard donated their territory in Gehrenberg to the abbey, and received the Roggenbeuren in exchange. Roggenbeuren later came into the hands of the ministerialis family of Schmalegg. In 1280 Conrad of Schmalegg sold the territory to the cathedral chapter of Constance. The upper jurisdiction was held by the Counts of Werdenberg-Heiligenberg and after their extinction in 1534 by the Counts of Fürstenberg.

In the Reichsdeputationshauptschluss of 1803, in which the principalities of the ecclesiastic rulers were dispersed to the counts and princes of the empire, Roggenbeuren with the other territories of the Prince-Bishopric of Constance was ceded to the Electorate of Baden.

Coat of arms

References

Bodenseekreis